The Dallara GP2/08 was an open-wheel formula racing car developed by Italian manufacturer Dallara for use in the GP2 Series, a feeder series for Formula One. The GP2/08 was the 2nd-generation car used by the GP2 Series, replacing the GP2/05, which had also been developed by Dallara. The GP2/08 was used from 2008 to 2010, in keeping with the series philosophy of introducing a chassis every 3 years. As the GP2 Series was a spec-formula, the car was utilised by all teams and drivers in the championship.

Development 
Planning and design of the car began in September 2006, with GP2 series Technical Director Didier Perrin laying down the initial design parameters, prior to handing over the detailed design work to Dallara, with it being decided relatively earlier that the partnerships from the first three years of GP2 would be continued until at least 2010, with a chassis by Dallara, Renault branded engine and gearbox by Mecachrome and tyres by Bridgestone. The car was also designed to be upgradable, with an upgrade kit to be issued each year, to keep up with changes in Formula 1.

The car featured a new and 'aggressively low' nose, alongside a single keel suspension and a sculpted front wing. The car had re-designed sidepods, the which were result of a new radiator and cooling set-up. The barge-boards are also noticeably different, being far larger and more sculpted than their predecessor. The rear end was also completely redesigned, with the contoured engine cover fitting over the Mecachrome-built V8 being far tighter than before, and while the rear of the sidepods featured both brand new cooling chimneys and a newer design of the 'shark gill' vents which appeared briefly in 2006. The rear point of the engine cover pulls down to a markedly different, and far neater, exhaust assembly, while the rear wing is a brand new development of that seen in 2007 The car also came with anti intrusion panels, and was designed to meet F1 crash test standards of the time, being the only non-F1 car to pass the 2007 Formula One Crash test.

The car had its initial shakedown at the Paul Ricard High Speed Test Track on 26 June 2007 by Nelson Piquet Jr., who was the runner-up in the previous season, completing 60 laps without any problems. The car was also launched on that day.

References 

GP2 Series
Dallara racing cars